Josef Vojtěch Hellich (17 April 1807 – 22 January 1880) was a Czech painter and archaeologist known mainly for religious works and historical scenes.

Biography 
Hellich was born in Choltice. He attended the Academy of Fine Arts, Prague, where he studied with Joseph Bergler, and the Academy of Fine Arts, Munich. This was followed by an extended study and work trip to Italy, Switzerland, France and England. He returned to Prague in 1840 and established a successful studio. With a recommendation from František Palacký, he became involved in the activities of the National Museum; becoming custodian and documentarian for the new archaeological collections.

In the following years, he gathered items for the museum from Kouřim, Žatec, Tábor and České Budějovice; including ornaments from prehistoric burial sites. Then, with the assistance of Professor Jan Erazim Vocel, the works were classified and described. Later, he illustrated Vocel's O starožitnostech českých a o potřebě chránit je před zkázou (Czech Antiquities and the Need to Protect them from Destruction), which became a popular work with Czech nationalists.

He was also a regular contributor of lithographs to the journal . His religious works include over 290 altarpieces which can be seen throughout the Czech Republic. Many of his paintings were acquired by Archbishop Schwarzenberg and Bishop Jan Valerián Jirsík.

He died in Prague on 22 January 1880, after contracting typhoid fever from drinking well water that had been contaminated by a flood.

Sources 

 Brief biography from Světozor, Vol.21, 1887 
Brief biography from Zlatá Praha, Vol.4, 1886/87
Brief biography from Zlatá Praha, Vol.1, 1864

Further reading 
 Ferdinand Břetislav Mikovec, Starožitnosti a Památky země České, Kober and  Markgraf (1860), illustrations by Josef Vojtěch Hellich and Vilém Kandler Full text online  
 Pavel Šopák, "Josef Vojtěch Hellich a náboženská malba. Poznámky k tématu", in Umění #44, 1996, pgs.540-548

External links 

"Josef Vojtěch Hellich, malíř a archeolog" by Dobromila Lebrová @ Pozitivní Noviny
Josef Hellich @ abART

1807 births
1880 deaths
People from Choltice
People from the Kingdom of Bohemia
19th-century Czech painters
Czech portrait painters
Czech illustrators
History painters
Religious artists
Czech archaeologists
Deaths from typhoid fever
Czech male painters
19th-century Czech male artists